Sangita Tripathi (born 8 July 1968) is a French fencer. She competed in the women's individual and team épée events at the 2000 Summer Olympics.

References

External links
 

1968 births
Living people
French female épée fencers
Olympic fencers of France
Fencers at the 2000 Summer Olympics
Fencers from Paris
Universiade medalists in fencing
Universiade silver medalists for France